Joe Dassin à New York is the first French studio album by Joe Dassin. It came out in 1966 on CBS Disques.

Track listing

References

External links 
 

1966 albums
Joe Dassin albums
CBS Disques albums

Albums produced by Jacques Plait